SCIV may refer to:

 Super Castlevania IV, a video game
 Soulcalibur IV, a video game